JRiver Media Center is a multimedia application that allows the user to play and organize various types of media on a computer running Windows, macOS, or Linux operating systems.

JRiver Media Center is a "jukebox"-style media player, like iTunes, which usually uses most of the screen to display a potentially very large library of files.

Regular (usually daily beta) builds are posted on the Media Center Interact forum implementing requested features and fixing reported bugs. The forum has an active member community, with more than 56,000 members as of 2021.

Also available for JRiver Media Center are an Audioscrobbler plugin, and G-Force, a popular visualization.

It can also rip and burn CDs. Media Center also supports static and dynamic playlists.

Library system
JRiver Media Center organizes files using Media Libraries; these are effective databases. Media Center can support multiple libraries.

Information relating to media is imported into the library, including meta data for media files and the path to the media files.  The media files themselves are not contained in the database, but cataloged within the libraries.

Version 12 of JRiver Media Center added support for auto-importing of media, whereby JRiver Media Center continually watches designated directories for changes in media.  If a new file is dropped into the directory, JRiver Media Center will add the file to its library. Each library can contain any type of media, video, audio, images etc.

View schemes
View Schemes are the main way to browse through files in Media Center. Views can be created which help users see different parts of their library; these are effectively the same as database views. They are based on using metadata as criterion for creating a filtered list of files.

The view system is very powerful and fully customizable. For example, a view could be made which shows only audio files in MP3 format which are longer than 3 minutes, or images taken in Africa in the year 2006.

For ease of use, several default views exist which show files of a specified type only, including: audio, images, or video.

Various view items, or panes, can be aligned to the top, left, right, or moved in drop-down menus, that can be used to further filter results. For example, one of the default views, artist/album, allows selecting a specific artist or album, or both, and shows files from that album or artist only.

Once a view is created, it is automatically saved in the library and can be opened in the various user interfaces and searched using a real-time search box. The searches are customizable and possible on any field or tag in the library.

Playlists
JRiver Media Center allows the creation of playlists. It also can export playlists as M3U, M3U8, ASX, MPL, CSV.

Smartlists
Smartlists are similar to playlists except that rather than selecting a list of songs, the list is governed by a set of rules.  For example, a smartlist might take every video file which was produced in 1994. Smartlists can be based on Playlists.  They are defined using an expression language.  Media Center provides a wizard style dialogue box to simplify creating these.

An added benefit of a smartlist over a basic playlist is that a smartlist is dynamic; it will update itself whenever new files that meet its criteria are added to the library. For example, one could create a smartlist to show all tracks with the genre tagged Indie Rock. If a new album were added to Media Center's library that had the Indie Rock genre tag, Media Center would automatically add those files to the smartlist.

User interfaces
JRiver Media Center provides four different user interfaces for use in different situations. Each user interface is skinnable.

Standard view

Through the default Media Center UI for desktop environment the user is exposed to all of the core multimedia features, such as:
 Tagging
 Ripping
 CD/DVD burning
 Accessing portable players
 Creating/editing playlists, smartlists, and views
 Setting up TV stations
 Accessing web media

Standard view occupies a large amount of screen space, can be viewed in either full screen or as a window mode, and it consists of the following components:
 Tree: allow for hierarchical navigation between different views of the Media Library
 Action Window: provides quick access to common tasks, such as ripping/burning
 Header: presents the playback controls and options for selected track
 Playing Now: displays current playlist items
 Panes/Thumbnails: aid in simple point and click media browsing
 Tagging panes: allows tagging media files

Theater view

While the Standard and Mini views are designed to be used in front of a desktop or laptop computers, Media Center includes an additional 10-foot user interface called the "Theater view".

This is made to work on a large screen, such as a television, projector or large computer screen. The interface is made to work in a 10-foot mode, i.e. from a living room sofa using remote controls, rather than the conventional mouse and keyboard.

As of JRiver Media Center 12, Theatre view relies on Microsoft's DirectX graphics engine.  With this, Media Center uses 3D and 2D Animation to create a more visually appealing interface, which more nearly resembles that of a digital recording box, or DVD player.

The Theater view doesn't provide the editing interfaces of Standard view, but instead provides much more accessible access to the different views of the library. All the buttons in Theater view are large, and tend to move to different pages to display different information.

Theater view also provides access to the weather, news websites and RSS feeds.

Mini view

Mini view is similar to that of Winamp. It's designed to take up minimal screen space while still providing access to basic controls. Mini view skins are different from the other UI skins seen in Media Center in that they can employ JavaScript to make them more dynamic. Mini views are far more flexible than the other types of skins, allowing Media Center to take various shapes and forms using transparency effects.

Networking
JRiver Media Center provides network access to its libraries using different server plugins.

Library server
Library server allows JRiver Media Center to share its active library with up to five client machines.  This is designed for situations where a server machine with large resources is set up in one area, and clients such as laptops with smaller resources can access media elsewhere.

TiVo server
JRiver Media Center supports TiVo's Home Media option, allowing TiVo to stream video and audio.

UPnP and DLNA servers

Web services integration
 Audible
 Amazon Music
 CD Baby
 Hulu
 MediaNet
 Netflix
 YouTube

Plugins
JRiver Media Center uses COM support to provide access to its SDK library. This allows plugins to be written in a wide variety of languages including:
 C++
 C#
 Object Pascal (Delphi)
 Visual Basic

A variety of plugins can be developed for specific components and purposes:
 Theater view plugins: allows creating extensions to Theater view
 Interface plugins: provide interface extensions for Standard view
 DSP plugins: allows directly manipulating sound processing
 Display plugins: allow creation of different visualizations
 Input plugins: can be used to add new formats to Media Center, which are not supported naively

It is also possible to create "Track Info" visualizations that are created in HTML to display information about the currently playing Media. These can be extended further using the various web languages around such as JavaScript.

A full list of available plugins can be found in the Accessories section on the official website.

Media formats
JRiver Media Center supports a wide range file formats among audio files, video files, photos and documents. A full lists of supported formats can be found on the JRiver Media Center wiki; (supported audio formats, supported video formats, and supported image formats). DirectShow is supported, allowing the playing of any video or audio format for which a DirectShow Filter is available, and installed.

Supported hardware
Amazon Echo powered intelligent loudspeakers.
 Android-based devices
 iOS-based: iPad, iPhone, iPod Touch
 Digital cameras
 Image scanners
 Removable media
 Smartphones
 TiVo
 Universal Plug and Play (UPnP)
 Digital Living Network Alliance (DLNA)

Scheduler
JRiver Media Center provides a scheduling tool which allows playing/recording of media at certain times.

Media Jukebox
JRiver Media Center's predecessor was named JRiver Media Jukebox, until the rebranding to JRiver Media Center for version 9. In November 2007, J. River released Media Jukebox 12, a stripped-down version of JRiver Media Center 12, which is available to download for free, compared to JRiver Media Center's price of $49.98. JRiver Media Jukebox includes most of the audio features of Media Center; the image and video functions are removed. The last version of JRiver Media Jukebox was version 14.0.166. However, the version 14 removed several features previously available for free (specifically CD and cover art lookup) and now only available in the Media Center product.  As such many still use the older free version of JRiver Media Jukebox 12.0.534.

Version history

See also
Comparison of media players

References

External links
 
 Official JRiver Media Center Interact forum
 Official JRiver Media Jukebox site
 Reviews

IPod software
Windows multimedia software
MacOS multimedia software
Windows-only software
Windows CD/DVD writing software
Jukebox-style media players
Video recording software